Francisco Valdés Vergara (4 October 1954 – 15 May 1916) was a Chilean politician and historian who served as President of the Senate of Chile.

External links
 BCN Profile

1854 births
1916 deaths
Chilean people
Chilean politicians
Liberal Party (Chile, 1849) politicians
University of Chile alumni
Presidents of the Senate of Chile
20th-century Chilean politicians